Yellow rice is a traditional yellow-colored rice dish in Spanish, Iranian, West Asian, Moroccan, Ecuadorian, Peruvian, Caribbean, Portuguese, Filipino, Afghan, Indian, Sri Lankan, South African and Indonesian cuisines. It is made using white rice made yellow with annatto, saffron or turmeric, ingredients used to give the rice its yellow color.

South African yellow rice, with its origins in Cape Malay cuisine, influenced by Indonesian cuisine, is traditionally made with raisins, sugar, and cinnamon, making a very sweet rice dish served as an accompaniment to savoury dishes and curries.

In Sri Lanka, it is known as kaha buth and draws from both Indonesian and Sri Lankan influences.

In Indonesia  it is known as nasi kuning. In the Philippines it is known as kuning.

See also
 Golden rice – A genetically modified variety of Oryza sativa rice that is golden-colored
 List of rice dishes

References

Rice dishes
Sri Lankan rice dishes